Beach Channel was a Long Island Rail Road station on the Rockaway Beach Branch in Broad Channel, Queens, New York. It was located on the north end of the Beach Channel Drawbridge across from the north leg of the Hammels Wye.

History
Beach Channel station was originally built in the spring of 1888 by the New York and Rockaway Beach Railway, a year after the bankruptcy of the New York, Woodhaven and Rockaway Railroad. Originating at the vicinity of Signal Station #101 (later the "HJ" Tower), the site was leased by a former congressman from Freeport, New York, named Thomas A. Smith. Originally serving as dropping off point for fishermen, it was expanded into a restaurant, with a bait & tackle shop, a boat rental dealership, and two hotels on both side of the tracks.

On June 13, 1903, the hotel on the east side of the tracks was destroyed by a 3:00 A.M. fire, taking the northbound platforms and part of the trestle with it. The hotel on the southbound platforms and an adjacent club house were unaffected by the fire, but both structures were moved to the mainland in response to the disaster in 1904, the same year NY&RB ceased as an independent railroad and became part of the LIRR. This would be the first of three major fires that would disrupt service on both the Rockaway Beach and Far Rockaway Branches. The next major fire took place at Howard's Landing station in 1907, and the third major fire would occur at The Raunt station in 1950. The LIRR sought permission from the New York Public Service Commission to abandon Beach Channel station, and finally received that permission on May 31, 1905.

References

External links
Electrification of Rockaway Beach Branch from Ozone Park to Hammel's Wye (Arrt's Arrchives)

Former Long Island Rail Road stations in New York City
Railway stations in the United States opened in 1888
Railway stations closed in 1905
1888 establishments in New York (state)
1905 disestablishments in New York (state)
Railway stations in Queens, New York